Someone at the Door is a 1950 British crime comedy film directed by Francis Searle and starring Michael Medwin, Garry Marsh and Yvonne Owen.

Basis
The film was based on a hit West End play by Campbell Christie and his wife Dorothy, which had previously been turned into a film in 1936.

Plot
A journalist comes up with a scheme to boost his career by inventing a fake murder but soon becomes embroiled in trouble when a real killing takes place.

Cast
 Michael Medwin as Ronnie Martin 
 Garry Marsh as Kapel 
 Yvonne Owen as Sally Martin 
 Hugh Latimer as Bill Reid 
 Danny Green as Price 
 Campbell Singer as Inspector Spedding 
 John Kelly as Police Constable

Critical reception
The Radio Times wrote, "this is Hammer hokum of the hoariest kind. There isn't a semblance of suspense...Not even the arrival of jewel thieves at the haunted house...can revive one's fast-fading interest. However, there is one good wheeze, during the credit sequence, when director Francis Searle reveals that the front of the old house is merely a flat piece of scenery erected in a field"; and Fantastic Movie Musings & Ramblings concluded, "it isn't much of a movie, but if you take it for what it is (a late-period old dark house variant based on a stage play), it has its uses. There are a few mildly amusing jokes and a couple of decent plot twists, which is more than some examples of this genre have."

References

External links

1950 films
British crime comedy films
British films based on plays
Films directed by Francis Searle
1950s crime comedy films
Remakes of British films
Hammer Film Productions films
1950 comedy films
British black-and-white films
1950s English-language films
1950s British films